The five teams (four of them played with Romania withdrawing) in this group played in a knockout stage on a home-and-away basis. The winner (Italy) qualified for the seventh FIFA World Cup held in Chile.

Matches

First round

Second round

Romania withdrew, so Italy advanced to the Final Round automatically.

Final round

External links
FIFA official page
RSSSF – 1962 World Cup Qualification
Allworldcup

7
1960–61 in Israeli football
Qual
1960–61 in Romanian football
1960–61 in Italian football
1961–62 in Romanian football 
1961–62 in Cypriot football 
1960 in African football
1961 in African football
football